FPS Magazine or fps magazine or Frames Per Second Magazine was a magazine specializing in animation, with reviews of animated films and other articles of interest to animation fans.

History and profile
fps was founded as a print magazine in 1991 by Montreal-based animation and technology writer Emru Townsend. The last print issue was released in December 1999. fps became a web-based publication on 22 February 2003, turing a blog, podcasts and PDF issues of the magazine. fps ceased active publication in 2010 following the death of Emru Townsend from leukemia.

fps featured a distinguished group of contributors, including filmmakers J.Walt Adamczyk, Charlie Bonifacio, Armen Boudjikanian, Mike Caputo, and Marc Elias; Michael A. Ventrella, founder of Animato! magazine, writers Brett D. Rogers and Fred Patten, author Carl Gustav Horn, academic Marc Hairston, and Tamu Townsend, writer and sister of publisher Emru Townsend.

Reception
Animation Insider praised the regular writing cast. They state that "the magazine is packed to the gills with interesting feature articles and product reviews that appeal to your average, or not so average, animation fan."

References

External links

1991 establishments in Quebec
2010 disestablishments in Quebec
Film magazines published in Canada
Canadian film websites
Online magazines published in Canada
Defunct magazines published in Canada
History of animation
Magazines established in 1991
Magazines disestablished in 1999
Magazines disestablished in 2010
Magazines published in Montreal
Websites about animation